The 1991 Geneva Open was a men's tennis tournament played on clay courts that was part of the World Series of the 1991 ATP Tour. It was the 12th edition of the tournament and was played at Geneva, Switzerland from 9 September through 16 September 1991. Unseeded Thomas Muster won the singles title.

Finals

Singles

 Thomas Muster defeated  Horst Skoff 6–2, 6–4
 It was Muster's 2nd title of the year and the 11th of his career.

Doubles

 Sergi Bruguera /  Marc Rosset defeated  Per Henricsson /  Ola Jonsson 3–6, 6–3, 6–2
 It was Bruguera's 3rd title of the year and the 5th of his career. It was Rosset's only title of the year and the 3rd of his career.

References

External links
 ITF tournament edition details